Guja Rukhaia (born 22 July 1987) is a Russian professional football player of Georgian descent.

Club career
He joined Dinamo Tbilisi in 2018.

References

External links
 
 

1987 births
Living people
Sportspeople from Batumi
Georgian emigrants to Russia
Russian footballers
Association football midfielders
Naturalised citizens of Russia
FC Chernomorets Novorossiysk players
FC Dynamo Stavropol players
FC Zhemchuzhina Sochi players
PFC Spartak Nalchik players
FC SKA-Khabarovsk players
FC KAMAZ Naberezhnye Chelny players
FC Sibir Novosibirsk players
FC Dinamo Tbilisi players
FC Samtredia players
FC Dynamo Bryansk players
Russian Premier League players
Erovnuli Liga players
Russian expatriate footballers
Expatriate footballers in Georgia (country)